National Bank of Pakistan Sports Complex, also known as NBP Sports Complex, is a sports complex located in Clifton, Karachi, Pakistan. Formerly, it was home ground of National Bank of Pakistan cricket team and Karachi cricket teams.

History
The ground staged its first-class match in 1998, and while it was the only match played that year, regular matches have been held here since the 2005-06 season.

This ground hosted fifty first-class, thirty-seven list A, and twelve twenty20 cricket matches from 1998 to 2012.

See also
Pakistan Cricket Board
List of cricket grounds in Pakistan

References

External links
 CricketArchive Ground Profile
 Cricinfo Ground Profile

Cricket grounds in Pakistan
Cricket in Karachi
Sports complexes